Edward Arthur Colebrooke, 1st Baron Colebrooke,  (12 October 1861 – 28 February 1939), known as Sir Edward Colebrooke, Bt, from 1890 to 1906, was a British Liberal politician and courtier. He served as Captain of the Honourable Corps of Gentlemen-at-Arms under H. H. Asquith and David Lloyd George between 1911 and 1922.

Background
Colebrooke was the son of Sir Thomas Colebrooke, 4th Baronet, and his wife Elizabeth Margaret Richardson, daughter of J. Richardson. He succeeded his father in the baronetcy in 1890.

Political career
In 1906 Colebrooke was raised to the peerage as Baron Colebrooke, of Stebunheath in the County of Middlesex. He served under Sir Henry Campbell-Bannerman and H. H. Asquith as a Lord-in-waiting (government whip in the House of Lords) from 1906 to 1911 and then under Asquith and later David Lloyd George as Government Chief Whip in the Lords and Captain of the Honourable Corps of Gentlemen-at-Arms from 1911 to 1922. In 1914 he was admitted to the Privy Council. Lord Colebrooke was also a Permanent Lord-in-Waiting from 1924 to 1939 and served as Lord High Commissioner to the General Assembly of the Church of Scotland from 1906 to 1907. He was made a Companion of the Royal Victorian Order (CVO) in 1906, a Knight Commander of the Royal Victorian Order (KCVO) in 1922 and a Knight Grand Cross of the Royal Victorian Order (GCVO) in 1927. He was also a deputy lieutenant of Lanarkshire.

Family
Lord Colebrooke married Alexandra Harriet Paget, daughter of General Lord Alfred Paget, in 1889. They had one son (who died in 1921) and two daughters. He died in February 1939, aged 77, when the baronetcy and barony became extinct. Lady Colebrooke died in 1944.

References

External links

1861 births
1939 deaths
Barons in the Peerage of the United Kingdom
Edward
People educated at Summer Fields School
Honourable Corps of Gentlemen at Arms
Members of the Privy Council of the United Kingdom
Knights Grand Cross of the Royal Victorian Order
Peers created by Edward VII